Alberto Nicolás Martínez (born 13 August 1990) is an Argentine professional footballer who plays as a midfielder for Deportivo Riestra.

Career
After youth stints with Atlas, Vélez Sarsfield and Ferro Carril Oeste, General Lamadrid were Martínez's first senior team. Five goals in seventy-three fixtures followed in Primera C Metropolitana across the 2008–09, 2009–10 and 2010–11 seasons, with the latter concluding with promotion to Primera B Metropolitana; though they'd be relegated after one season, as he appeared thirty-one times. In early 2013, Deportivo Español of the fourth tier completed the signing of Martínez. Four goals in fifty-seven fixtures occurred along with promotion. He had a stint back with General Lamadrid to end 2014, prior to joining San Telmo.

Martínez won his third career promotion whilst with San Telmo, all coming under the management of Jorge Franzoni. Martínez scored on his first appearance in Primera B Metropolitana for San Telmo, netting in a February 2016 victory over Acassuso. During the 2016–17 Primera B Metropolitana, Martínez scored twelve goals in the league; with braces against Acassuso, Colegiales and Villa San Carlos. On 30 June 2017, Martínez agreed a loan move to Primera B de Chile side Unión La Calera. He participated in eighteen matches in all competitions in the 2017 season, as the club won promotion via the play-offs.

In January 2018, Martínez was loaned to Deportivo Riestra for the rest of 2017–18 in Primera B Nacional and all of 2018–19 in Primera B Metropolitana. In February 2021, Martínez moved Almirante Brown until the end of the year. He then re-joined his former club General Lamadrid ahead of the 2022, before returning to Deportivo Riestra in June 2022.

Career statistics
.

Honours
General Lamadrid
Primera C Metropolitana: 2010–11

San Telmo
Primera C Metropolitana: 2015

Unión La Calera
Primera B: 2017

References

External links

1990 births
Living people
People from Moreno Partido
Argentine footballers
Association football midfielders
Argentine expatriate footballers
Expatriate footballers in Chile
Argentine expatriate sportspeople in Chile
Primera C Metropolitana players
Primera B Metropolitana players
Primera B de Chile players
Primera Nacional players
General Lamadrid footballers
Deportivo Español footballers
San Telmo footballers
Unión La Calera footballers
Deportivo Riestra players
Club Almirante Brown footballers
Sportspeople from Buenos Aires Province